Polls leading up to the 1988 Canadian federal election.

National polls

Campaign period

During the 33rd Parliament of Canada

By geographic area

In Québec

In Ontario

In Alberta

In British Columbia

References

External links

1988 Canadian federal election
1988 general election
Canada